Stresher Peninsula is the predominantly ice-covered rectangular peninsula 30 km wide and projecting 24 km northwestwards from Graham Land, Antarctic Peninsula. It is bounded by Holtedahl Bay to the northeast, Auvert Bay to the northwest and Darbel Bay to the southwest. Its west extremity Cape Bellue separates Graham Coast to the northeast from Loubet Coast to the southwest.

The feature is named after Stresher Peak in the Balkan Mountains, Bulgaria.

Maps
 British Antarctic Territory.  Scale 1:200000 topographic map. DOS 610 Series, Sheet W 66 64.  Directorate of Overseas Surveys, Tolworth, UK, 1976.
 Antarctic Digital Database (ADD). Scale 1:250000 topographic map of Antarctica. Scientific Committee on Antarctic Research (SCAR), 1993–2016.

See also
Owlshead Peak
Wooden Peak
Workman Rocks

References
 Stresher Peninsula. SCAR Composite Antarctic Gazetteer.
 Bulgarian Antarctic Gazetteer. Antarctic Place-names Commission. (details in Bulgarian, basic data in English)

External links
 Stresher Peninsula. Copernix satellite image

Bulgaria and the Antarctic
Peninsulas of Graham Land
Graham Coast
Loubet Coast